In Greek mythology, Paean (Ancient Greek: Παιάν), Paeëon or Paieon (Ancient Greek: Παιήων), or Paeon or Paion (Ancient Greek: Παιών) may refer to the following characters:

 Paean (god), the physician of the Greek gods.
 Paeon (father of Agastrophus), the father of Agastrophus in Homer's Iliad, and the husband of Cleomede and father of Laophoon in Quintus Smyrnaeus' Posthomerica.Quintus Smyrnaeus, p. 112, 6.549–555; Parada, "Paeon 1." p. 135; Connor, "Paeon" p. 1096.
 Paeon (son of Antilochus), a lord of Messenia, from whom the Attic clan and deme of Paeonidae or Paionidai is supposed to have derived its name.
 Paeon (son of Endymion),  from whom the district of Paionia was believed to have derived its name.
 Paeon (son of Poseidon), the son of Helle and Poseidon; in some legends he was called Edonus.
 Paeon, son of Ares and father of Biston.
 Paean, an epithet for the Greek god Apollo.
 Paean, an epithet for the Greek healer-god Asclepius.

Notes

References 

 Homer, The Iliad with an English Translation by A.T. Murray, Ph.D. in two volumes. Cambridge, MA., Harvard University Press; London, William Heinemann, Ltd. 1924. . Online version at the Perseus Digital Library.
 Homer, Homeri Opera in five volumes. Oxford, Oxford University Press. 1920. . Greek text available at the Perseus Digital Library.
 Pausanias, Description of Greece with an English Translation by W.H.S. Jones, Litt.D., and H.A. Ormerod, M.A., in 4 Volumes. Cambridge, MA, Harvard University Press; London, William Heinemann Ltd. 1918. . Online version at the Perseus Digital Library
 Pausanias, Graeciae Descriptio. 3 vols. Leipzig, Teubner. 1903.  Greek text available at the Perseus Digital Library.
 Quintus Smyrnaeus, The Fall of Troy translated by Way. A. S. Loeb Classical Library Volume 19. London: William Heinemann, 1913. Online version at theio.com
 Quintus Smyrnaeus, The Fall of Troy. Arthur S. Way. London: William Heinemann; New York: G.P. Putnam's Sons. 1913. Greek text available at the Perseus Digital Library.

Children of Ares